This is a list of notable alumni and faculty from the ArtCenter College of Design, a private design college in Pasadena, California, United States.

Alumni

Entertainment Design
 Ryan Church, concept designer
 Kendal Cronkhite, production designer
 Ralph McQuarrie, conceptual designer and futurist (Star Wars)
 Syd Mead, concept designer, futurist
 Neville Page, Emmy Award-winning creature and concept designer
 Andy Park, Visual Development designer Marvel Studios
 Richard Vander Wende, concept and video game designer (Riven)
 Ross Tran , Youtuber

Film and Graduate Film
 Viktor Antonov, concept designer, art director (Half-Life 2, Renaissance)
 Jon Jon Augustavo, music video and film director
 Roger Avary, Academy Award-winning co-writer of Pulp Fiction
 Michael Bay, film director
 Don Burgess, cinematographer
 Ericson Core
 Wayne Fitzgerald, title sequence designer
 Larry Fong, cinematographer
 Dave Goelz, puppeteer
 Dennis Gassner, Academy Award-winning production designer often working with directors Sam Mendes and the Coen Brothers
 Shelly Johnson, cinematographer (Jurassic Park III)
 Saman Kesh, director of film and music videos
 Kevin Mack, Academy Award-winning visual effects supervisor
 Robert A. Nakamura, film director, co-founder of Visual Communications, teacher
 John Pomeroy, animator
 Alex Ranarivelo, film director
 Brooke Roberts, director
 Matthew Rolston, photographer and director
 Dan Santat, author, illustrator, creator of Disney's The Replacements
 Tarsem Singh, film director
 Zack Snyder, film director
 Jefferson Stein, film director
 Bruce Surtees, cinematographer
 Miles Teves, artist and conceptual designer
 Mark Whiting, writer and director; production designer with Warner Bros., The Iron Giant

Fine Art and Graduate Art
 Doug Aitken, multimedia artist
 Lynn Aldrich, sculptor
 Edgar Arceneaux, artist
 Carol Bennett, painter and glass artist
 Clayton Brothers, painter
 Lawrence Carroll, painter
 Tom Christopher, painter
 Lindsay Dawson, painter
 Hedi El Kholti, fine artist, writer and editor
 Eyvind Earle, fine art painter
 James Gurney, illustrator and painter
 Frank Hagel, painter and sculptor
 Thomas Kinkade, painter of light
 Melissa Kretschmer, contemporary artist
 Sharon Lockhart, contemporary artist
 Richard MacDonald, sculptor
 Patrick Martinez, multimedia artist
 Rebeca Méndez, multimedia artist
 Craig Mullins, concept artist and painter
 Jorge Pardo, contemporary artist
 Bob Peak, illustrator
 Mark Ryden, fine art painter
 Sterling Ruby, artist
 Stan Sakai, comic book artist
 Ken Shutt, sculptor
 Gordon Smedt, Pop Art painter
 Jeff Soto, fine art painter
 Jennifer Steinkamp, installation artist
 Hiroshi Sugimoto, fine art photographer and architect
 Mark Tansey, artist and painter
 Diana Thater, artist
 Shirley Tse, artist
 Richard Wagener, fine press printer, publisher, engraver
 Casey Weldon, painter
 Jennifer West, fine artist using digitized film
 Jack Wemp, fine art painter
 Pae White, fine art painter
 Charles Wysocki, painter

Graphic Design
 Stefan G. Bucher, graphic designer
 John Casado, graphic designer and photographer
 Louis Danziger, graphic designer
 Jesse Genet, graphic designer and businessperson
 Joe Hahn, DJ for Linkin Park
 John Van Hamersveld, graphic designer known for iconic The Endless Summer poster
 Kit Hinrichs, graphic designer
 Lee Ji-ah, actress and screenwriter
 Teddy Lo, Hong Kong-based LED artist
 Alvin Lustig, graphic designer
 Rebeca Mendez, graphic designer
 Clement Mok, graphic designer
 Mike Shinoda, MC and multi-instrumentalist for Linkin Park
 Yu Tsai, fashion photographer

Illustration
 Peter Brown, illustrator
 Justin Bua, illustrator and art teacher at the University of Southern California
 Marc Burckhardt, illustrator
 Ricardo Delgado, comic book artist
 Marla Frazee, illustrator
 Grace Lynne Haynes, illustrator
 Philip Hays, illustrator
 Bob Jones, illustrator
 Rafael López, illustrator and artist
 Richard MacDonald, figurative sculptor
 Matt Mahurin, illustrator, photographer and film director
 Mick McGinty, illustrator, fine artist
 Tara McPherson, illustrator, fine artist
 Floyd Norman, animator
 John Parra, illustrator
 LeUyen Pham, illustrator
 Robert Quackenbush, illustrator
 Walter Rane, illustrator and painter
 Marc Remus, illustrator
 Dan Santat, illustrator
 Alex Schaefer, painter and activist
 Lane Smith, illustrator
 Barron Storey, illustrator
 Drew Struzan, illustrator
 Ray Turner, painter
 Michael Whelan, artist of imaginative realism

Photography and Imaging
 Fred R. Archer
 Sid Avery, Hollywood photographer
 Andrew D. Bernstein, official photographer of the NBA
 Mauren Brodbeck, Swiss artist
 Howell Conant, fashion photographer associated with Grace Kelly
 Barbara DuMetz, photographer
 Lee Friedlander, photographer
 Ron Galella, paparazzo photographer
 Dean Karr
 Fred Lyon (1924–2022), American photographer, attended but did not graduate
 Melodie McDaniel
 Norman Mauskopf
 Dewey Nicks, fashion photographer
 Rip Noel, commercial photographer & film maker
 Greg Preston
 Marcia Reed, movie stills photographer 
 Co Rentmeester
 Matthew Rolston
 Suza Scalora
 Hiroshi Sugimoto, fine artist, photographer and architect
 Charlie White
 Penny Wolin
 Russel Wong

Product Design
Yves Béhar, founder of fuseproject 
 Kenji Ekuan, industrial designer, best known for creating the design of the Kikkoman soy sauce bottle
 Frank Nuovo, Chief of Design at Nokia
 Satyendra Pakhale, designer

Spatial Experience Design and Graduate Spatial Experience Design (formerly Environmental Design) 
 Ini Archibong, artist and designer
 Bruce Burdick, designer
 Nolen Niu, industrial designer

Transportation design
 Chris Bangle, former chief of design at BMW
 Harald Belker, automobile designer, designed vehicles for Batman & Robin and Minority Report
 Gordon Buehrig, automobile designer
 Wayne Cherry, former vice president of global design at General Motors
 Dilip Chhabria, Indian automotive designer
 Michelle Christensen, automobile designer, best known as lead designer of the second generation Acura NSX
 John Chun, automotive designer
 Willie G. Davidson, vice president of styling at Harley-Davidson
 Luc Donckerwolke, automotive designer
 Henrik Fisker, automotive designer
 Chip Foose, automotive designer
 Miguel Angel Galluzzi, chief designer of Piaggio Group, designer of the Ducati Monster
 Greg M. Greeson, automotive designer with Opel, VW, IAD, GRIDdesign
 Jon Ikeda, automobile designer, vice president and brand officer of Acura
 Derek Jenkins, automobile designer, vice president of design of Lucid Motors
 Richard Kim, automotive designer
 Géza Lóczi, director of design at Volvo Monitoring Concept Center
 J Mays, automotive designer
 Shiro Nakamura, automotive designer, served as senior vice president of Nissan Motor Co. Ltd.
 Ken Okuyama, automotive and vehicle designer
 Charles Pelly, industrial designer; founder of DesignworksUSA
 Nick Pugh, automotive designer, artist
 Larry Shinoda, automotive designer, best known for his work on the Chevrolet Corvette and Ford Mustang
 Frank Stephenson, award-winning automobile designer, best known for his design of the Mini Hatch, and design work at Fiat, Alfa Romeo, Ferrari and McLaren
 Dick Teague, vice president of design, American Motors Corporation
 Jeff Teague, automotive designer
 Jack Telnack, former vice president of global design of the Ford Motor Company
 Freeman Thomas, automobile designer
 Franz von Holzhausen, automotive designer with Tesla Motors
 Gerald Wiegert, automobile designer, founder of Vector

Graduate Industrial design 
 Satyendra Pakhale, industrial designer
 David Stollery, actor and industrial designer

Faculty

Ansel Adams
 Lita Albuquerque
Affonso Beato
Edward Biberman
Roger Blonder
Bruce Burdick
Allen Daviau
Stan Douglas
Craig Elliott
Paul Frank
Amy Gerstler
Jeremy Gilbert-Rolfe
Peter Gould, Breaking Bad and Better Call Saul
Paul Guay
Garnet Hertz
Burne Hogarth
Paul Jasmin
Mike Kelley
John La Gatta
Ross LaManna
Norman Mauskopf
Rebeca Mendez
Laura Owens
Ken Okuyama
Bob Peterson
Stephen Prina
Matthew Rolston
Ian Stendal
Diana Thater
Mayo Thompson
Lynda Weinman
Kent Williams
Penny Wolin
Doyald Young

References

Art Center College of Design people